Lőwy Hevesi Lajos, or Ludwig Hevesi (December 20, 1843, Heves, Hungary – February 17, 1910, Vienna) was a Hungarian journalist and writer.

He studied medicine and classical philology in Budapest and Vienna, but soon turned to writing, and as of 1865 he was an active journalist and author. In 1866, he became engaged as a contributor to the "Pester Lloyd", and later to the "Breslauer Zeitung", for which publications he wrote humorous feuilletons. In 1875, Hevesi settled in Vienna and became the associate editor for the art department of the Wiener Fremden-Blatt. He also wrote dramatic criticisms on the performances in the Hofburgtheater. During 1871-74 he edited "Kleine Leute", a journal for the young. The first 7 volumes of the journal originated exclusively from his pen. In conjunction with a few friends he founded the Hungarian humor publication "Borsszem Jankó", which soon became a popular journal.

Works
 A kereskedelmi levelezésnek kézikönyve. Pest 1864. [A manual of commercial correspondence]
 Sie sollen ihn nicht haben: Heiteres aus ernster Zeit. Köhler, Leipzig 1871 (Humor)
 Kleine Leute: Illustrirte Kinderzeitung. Budapest 1871/74. (7 vols.)
 Jelky András: bajai fiú rendkivüli kalandjai ötödfél világrészben. Pest 1872. New translated by Jószef Takách: Die Abenteuer des András Jelky in drei Erdteilen. New edition by János Czibor based on 3rd ed. 1879. Corvina, Budapest 1961. (several editions.).
 Budapest und seine Umgebung. Ráth, Budapest 1873. Hungarian ed.: Budapest  és környéke. Budapest 1873
 Des Schneidergesellen Andreas Jelky Abenteuer in vier Welttheilen. Nach historischen Quellen zum ersten Male ausführlich dargestellt und der reiferen Jugend gewidmet von Onkel Tom. Redakteur der "Kleinen Leute". Mit sechs Holzschnitten nach Zeichnungen von Johann Greguß. Franklin-Verein, Budapest 1875.
 Karczképek az ország fővárosából. Budapest 1876. [Sketches from the Capital]
 Auf der Schneide: Ein Geschichtenbuch. Bonz, Stuttgart 1884
 Neues Geschichtenbuch. Bonz, Stuttgart 1885
 Auf der Sonnenseite: Ein Geschichtenbuch. Bonz, Stuttgart 1886. Microfiche ed.: Belser, Wildberg 1989/90, 
 Almanaccando: Bilder aus Italien. Bonz, Stuttgart 1888
 Buch der Laune: Neue Geschichten. Bonz, Stuttgart 1889
 Ein englischer September: Heitere Fahrten jenseits des Kanals. Bonz, Stuttgart 1891
 Regenbogen: Sieben heitere Geschichten. Ill. Wilhelm Schulz. Bonz, Stuttgart 1892
 Von Kalau bis Säkkingen: Ein gemütliches Kreuz und Quer Bonz, Stuttgart 1893
 Tübingen: Eine Reiseskizze. 1893
 Zerline Gabillon: Ein Künstlerleben. Ill. 18 drawings by Helene Bettelheim-Gabillon. Bonz, Stuttgart 1894
 Glückliche Reisen. Bonz, Stuttgart 1895
 Wilhelm Junker: Lebensbild eines Afrikaforschers. Weidmann, Berlin 1896
 Victor Tilgners ausgewählte Werke. Wien 1897
 Die Althofleute: Ein Sommerroman. Ill. by Wilhelm Schulz. Bonz, Stuttgart, 1897
 Blaue Fernen: Neue Reisebilder. Bonz, Stuttgart 1897
 Das bunte Buch: Humoresken aus Zeit und Leben, Litteratur und Kunst. Bonz, Stuttgart 1898
 Wiener Totentanz: Gelegentliches über verstorbene Künstler und ihresgleichen. Bonz, Stuttgart 1899. New ed.: Innsbruck, Univ. 2007, 
 Ideen. Olbrich Josef M.; Einf. von Ludvig Hevesi. Wien [1899]
 Der zerbrochene Franz nebst anderen Humoresken und Geschichten. Bonz, Stuttgart 1900
 Mac Eck's sonderbare Reisen zwischen Konstantinopel und San Francisco. Bonz, Stuttgart 1901
 Österreichische Kunst im 19. Jahrhundert. Seemann, Leipzig 1903. 1. T.: 1800-1848. 2. T.: 1848-1900
 Ewige Stadt, ewiges Land: Frohe Fahrt in Italien. Bonz, Stuttgart 1903
 Sonne Homers: Heitere Fahrten durch Griechenland und Sizilien 1802-1904. Bonz, Stuttgart 1905
 Rudolf von Alt: Variationen. Konegen, Wien 1905
 Schiller - Lenau: – Zwei Concordia-Reden. Konegen, Wien 1905
 Die fünfte Dimension: Humore der Zeit, des Lebens, der Kunst. Konegen, Wien 1906
 8 Jahre Secession: (March 1897 - June 1905);  Kritik - Polemik – Chronik. Konegen, Vienna 1906. Reprint: Wiederhrsg. u. eingeleitet von Otto Breicha. Ritter, Klagenfurt 1984, 
 Der Zug um den Mund. Bonz, Stuttgart 1907
 Gut munkeln: Neue Humore der neuen Zeit. Bonz, Stuttgart 1909
 Altkunst - Neukunst: Wien 1894 - 1908. Konegen, Vienna 1909. Reprint: Wiederhrsg. u. eingeleitet von Otto Breicha. Ritter, Klagenfurt 1986, 
 Flagranti und andere Heiterkeiten Bonz, Stuttgart 1910. Nee ed.:  Metroverlag, Vienna 2009, 
 Ludwig Speidel: eine literarisch-biographische Würdigung. Meyer & Jessen, Berlin 1910
 Rudolf von Alt: Sein Leben und sein Werk. Nach dem hinterlassenen Manuskripte für den Druck vorbereitet von Karl M. Kuzmany. Edited by k.k. Ministerium für Kultus und Unterricht. Mit 61 Tafeln und 100 Textbildern. Artaria, Vienna 1911
 Das grosse Keinmalkeins. Edited by Gunther Martin. Zsolnay, Vienna, Darmstadt 1990,

Translations into German
 Árpád Berczik: Mütter und Töchter, Lustspiel in drei Aufzügen. Bonz, Stuttgart 1893 (Theater play)
 Hungarian volumes of the edition: Az Osztrák-Magyar Monarchia írásban és képben. Hungarian translation of original edition in German: Die österreichisch-ungarische Monarchie in Wort und Bild. Vol. 5, 9, 12, 16, 18, 21, 23. 1888-1902

References
 
 Internationales Germanistenlexikon 1800-1950, ed Christoph König., de Gruyter, Berlin-New York 2003, 
 Sármány, Ilona. "Ludwig Hevesi". In Alte und Moderne Kunst. Wien 1985. Issue 203. .
 Sármány, Ilona. "Hevesi Lajos Tárcái a magyar festészetről az 1888-1896 közötti időszakban. (Art critics by Ludwig Hevesis Hungarian painting between 1888 and 1896)" In Ars Hungarica. Budapest, 1990/1. .
 Sármány-Parsons, Ilona. "Ludwig Hevesi und die Rolle der Kunstkritik zwischen 1889 und 1997". In Acta Historia Artium. Budapest, 1990/92. .
 Sármány-Parsons, Ilona. "Art Criticism and the Construction of National Heritage".  In National Heritage- National Canon . Mihály Szegedi-Maszák (eds). Collegium Budapest Workshop Series No.11.  Budapest 2001. .
 Sármány-Parsons, Ilona. "Ludwig Hevesi, 1842-1910: Die Schaffung eines Kanons der österreichischen Kunst 1. Part: Frühe Jahre und Wegbereiter". In ÖGL ( Österreich in Geschichte und Literatur) 47. Jg. 2003.Issue 6. .
 Sármány-Parsons, Ilona. "Ludwig Hevesi, 1943-1910: Die Schaffung eines kanons der österreichischen Kunst. 2.Teil Frühe Kritiken und Feuilletons". In Österreich in Geschichte und Literatur . 48. Jg. 2004. Issue 6. .
 Sármány-Parsons, Ilona. "Ludwig Hevesi – Die Schaffung eines Kanons der österreichischen Kunst. 3.teil". In Österreich in Geschichte und Literatur. 50. Jg. Nr.1-2. .
 Sármány-Parsons, Ilona. "A modern magyar festők első kiállitása Bécsben. ( Die erste Ausstellung moderner Maler in Wien )". In „A feledés árja alól új földeket hóditok vissza“ Irások Timár Àrpád tiszteletére. MTA Művészettöténeti Kutatóintézet, Mission Art Galléria. Budapest 2009. .
 Sármány-Parsons, Ilona. "The Art Criticism of Ludwig Hevesi in the Age of Historicism". In Austrian Studies Vol 16. (208), .

1843 births
1910 deaths
People from Heves
Jewish Hungarian writers
Hungarian journalists
Hungarian writers
1910 suicides